Roberto Garofoli (born 20 April 1966) is an Italian magistrate and civil servant. He served as secretary of the council of ministers in the cabinet of Prime Minister Mario Draghi.

He has a degree in law from the University of Bari.

References

External links

Living people
1966 births
People from Taranto
Government ministers of Italy
Draghi Cabinet
University of Bari alumni
Italian magistrates
21st-century Italian politicians